This article lists all forms of grenade launchers around the world, that is to say weapons that launch grenades with more accuracy, a higher velocity and to greater distances than a soldier could.

Below is the list of grenade launchers.

See also 
 List of weapons
 List of firearms
 List of machine guns
 List of multiple-barrel firearms
 List of pistols
 List of revolvers
 List of sniper rifles
 List of flamethrowers

References 

Grenade launchers